Passion is a 1987 studio album by Robin Trower. The album received  positive reviews and was followed by a US tour. The album was honored with a first place award in the Rock category by the American Association of Independent Music.

Track listing
All tracks by Robin Trower and Dave Bronze except where noted

Side one
 "Caroline" (Robin Trower, Reg Webb) – 4:02
 "Secret Doors" (Trower, Webb) – 4:16
 "If Forever" – 4:44
 "Won't Even Think About You" – 3:37

Side two
 "Passion" – 3:59
 "No Time" (Trower, Dave Bronze, Webb) – 4:31
 "Night" (Trower) – 3:57
 "Bad Time" – 3:26
 "One More Word" – 3:44

Personnel
 Davey Pattison – lead vocals
 Robin Trower – guitars
 Dave Bronze – bass, bass synth, vocals
 Reg Webb – keyboards
 Robert A. Martin – keyboards, backing vocals
 Pete Thompson – drums
 Paul Warren – backing vocals

References

External links 
 Robin Trower - Passion (1987) album releases & credits at Discogs
 Robin Trower - Passion (1987) album to be listened on Spotify
 Robin Trower - Passion (1987) album to be listened on YouTube

1987 albums
Robin Trower albums